The Vision is a British television film which had its first showing on 9 January 1988 on BBC1. The film was written by William Nicholson and directed by Norman Stone. It starred Dirk Bogarde, Lee Remick and Helena Bonham Carter. It was episode 1 of the fourth series of Screen Two.

Filming locations included The Exchange, Mount Stuart Square, Cardiff, South Glamorgan, Wales, United Kingdom. The film was the main feature on the front cover of the Radio Times when it was first shown.

Plot

A sinister cult uses a new television station to create a new European order. Dirk Bogarde plays a has-been UK TV personality hired to front the organisation but grows uneasy about its aims. At the end of the film, he attempts to warn the television audience about the dangers they face during the station's first transmission. But he fails to realise that recorded footage is being played during his "live" broadcast. He only realises when he is escorted from the studio by a stony-faced security guard and sees on the television monitors the (innocuous) beginning of his broadcast followed by a swift cut to his interviewer who thanks him for his contribution and then announces the showing of their first film, Back to the Future.

Music
Bill Connor wrote the original music for the film.

The film features the sound track Watch the Skies by Ken Howard.

Cast

The film starred Dirk Bogarde and Helena Bonham Carter.

 Eileen Atkins ...  Helen Marriner 
 Elizabeth Baker ...  Party Hostess 
 Lynda Bellingham ...  Mary Morris 
 James Frank Benson ...  Pressman 
 Bruce Boa ...  Channel President 
 Dirk Bogarde ...  James Marriner 
 Helena Bonham Carter ...  Jo Marriner 
 Richard Cubison ...  Derek Miles 
 Alan Curtis ...  Lord Mallory 
 Philip Goldacre ...  Richard Jenkins 
 Linda Jesticoe ...  Drama Producer 
 Martin Jones ...  News Editor 
 Michael Lees ...  John Harvey 
 David Lyon ...  Richard Beck 
 Paul Maxwell ...  Bill Freed 
 Lisabeth Miles ...  Margaret Bunn 
 Bruce Montague ...  Geoffrey Gilman 
 Philip O'Brien ...  Charlie Parrott 
 Stevie Parry ...  Personnel Officer 
 Tony Philips ...  First Agent 
 Lee Remick ...  Grace Gardner 
 Josh Richards ...  Pressman 
 Alan Rowlands ...  Carson 
 Frank Rozelaar-Green ...  Second Agent 
 Hugh Thomas ...  Studio Director

External links

1988 television films
1988 films
British television films
1980s English-language films